2K resolution is a generic term for display devices or content having horizontal resolution of approximately 2,000 pixels. For television and consumer media,  is the most common 2K resolution, but this is normally referred to as 1080p.

Resolutions

Standards and terminology 
In the cinematography industry, 2K resolution traditionally refers to a digital scan of 35mm film with a resolution around 2000 pixels wide.

This is the resolution of the 2K container format standardized by DCI in their Digital Cinema System Specification in 2005. The resolution of the encapsulated video content follows the SMPTE 428-1 standard, which establishes the following resolutions for a 2K distribution:
  (full frame,  or  aspect ratio)
  (flat crop,  aspect ratio)
  (CinemaScope crop,  aspect ratio)

However, the term "2K" itself is generic, was not coined by DCI, and does not refer specifically to the DCI 2K standard. Usage of the term "2K" predates the publication of the DCI standard.

The resolution  has also been referred to as a 2K resolution by other standards organizations like NHK Science & Technology Research Laboratories and ITU Radiocommunication Sector (which were involved in the standardization of 1080p HDTV and 4K UHDTV).

In consumer products,  is often incorrectly referred to as "2K", but it and similar formats are more traditionally categorized as 2.5K resolutions.

See also 
 1440p
 21:9 aspect ratio
 8K resolution

References 

Digital imaging
Film and video technology